Allanton is the name of several towns and villages.

New Zealand
Allanton, New Zealand, a small township south of Dunedin in the South Island

Scotland
Allanton, Scottish Borders, a small village between Duns and Berwick-upon-Tweed
Allanton, Dumfries and Galloway, a small village between Dumfries and Thornhill, Stirling
Allanton, North Lanarkshire, a village between Wishaw and Shotts
Allanton, South Lanarkshire, a small village on the outskirts of Hamilton

See also
Allenton (disambiguation)
Allentown (disambiguation)